Mexico City Arena is an indoor arena in Azcapotzalco, Mexico City, Mexico. It hosts concerts, sports, and other events. It officially opened on February 25, 2012. The total cost of the arena was $300 million. The arena has a maximum capacity of 22,300 spectators. It is operated by Zignia Live. It is located in Avenida de las Granjas, close to Ferrería metro station, Fortuna railway station of the Suburban Railway, and next to TecMilenio University.

History
The construction began on March 18, 2009, where the Mexico City Mayor, Marcelo Ebrard, was present. The place where the Arena is located used to be the Old Ferreria Cattle Ranch many years ago. It is an 8-hectare land. KMD Architects Mexico was in charge of the design of the Arena along with AVALANZ Group. Construction companies Grupo Garza Ponce, Corey and ADIPPSA are responsible for the development. It is the most up-to-date Arena in Mexico City, the biggest and it is the first arena in the city to have its own parking lot. On November 17, 2010, there was an event that took place in the early construction of the Arena which was called '300 days'. Guillermo Salinas Pliego, head of AVALANZ, promised to finish the project in 300 days. He added "It looks difficult but, the Monterrey Arena was the same and it was finished in nine months". He also talked about the idea sent to KMD Architects for the design of the Arena. He wanted it to "be astonishing on an urban level. Like an icon of the city". The Arena was opened officially with a concert by Mexican singer Luis Miguel on February 25, 2012.

For the construction 5,000 tons of structural steel, 25,000 tons of reinforced steel and 100,000 cubic meters of concrete were used. 225,000 square meters of construction built on an 8 hectare land. The Arena is 45 meters high. It has 2 heliports, a parking lot with capacity of 5,000 cars, 124 luxury suites, 650 security cameras, 850 LCD screens and a capacity of 22,300 people depending on the event. One of the most distinctive things about the Arena are the outdoor LED screen, which has an area of 6,200 square meters, and the indoor screen in the centerhung, with an area of 700 square meters, making both of the screens one of the largest indoor and outdoor displays in the world. Also, 450 meters of digital rings can be seen inside. All of the LED displays are provided by Daktronics.

On February 24, 2012, one day before the official opening, Marcelo Ebrard unveiled the Arena's inauguration plaque. He spoke about the benefits of the Arena, one of them being the 2,500 permanent jobs and the development of Azcapotzalco. On the other hand, Guillermo Salinas mentioned that "this Arena built for the people in Mexico City will modernize the current entertainment infrastructure, because the last place built for that kind of purpose was the Sports Palace Dome, which was built in 1968".

The arena is frequently used by tours operated by Feld Entertainment. Shows like Disney On Ice, Ringling Brothers and Barnum & Bailey Circus (before its closure) and Monster Jam have used the arena.

Additionally, the NBA has expressed interest in having a team in México, potentially in this arena. On December 4, 2013, a regular-season game between the San Antonio Spurs and Minnesota Timberwolves scheduled at the arena was canceled when a fire from a generator malfunction filled the building with smoke. As a result, their rematch would instead be played at the Target Center. However, the NBA has held games in the arena since then, with the next games coming on January 12 and 14, 2017, with the Phoenix Suns playing against both the Dallas Mavericks and the San Antonio Spurs respectively. The Suns would lose 113–108 to the Mavericks, but win 108–105 against the Spurs. In December 2017, the Brooklyn Nets hosted the Oklahoma City Thunder and Miami Heat at the arena.
On December 13, 2018, speaking before the Orlando Magic faced the Chicago Bulls at the 22,300-seat Arena Ciudad de Mexico, Silver was complimentary of the building, and said he hoped other, similar venues would pop up in other parts of the Americas. For the 2019-20 NBA Season, the Dallas Mavericks will play host to the Detroit Pistons and the Phoenix Suns to the San Antonio Spurs.

Events 
The arena has been a frequent host of boxing, mixed martial arts and lucha libre (professional wrestling) events. Ultimate Fighting Championships has held two pay-per-view events at the arena. Lucha Libre AAA Worldwide has held their largest annual show, Triplemanía, at the arena since the twentieth edition in 2012. Events at the arena include:
Mixed Martial Arts
UFC 180 – November 15, 2014
UFC 188 – June 13, 2015
UFC Fight Night 98 - November 5, 2016
UFC Fight Night: Pettis vs. Moreno - August 5, 2017
UFC Fight Night: Rodríguez vs. Stephens - September 21, 2019
Lucha Libre
Triplemanía XX – August 5, 2012
Triplemanía XXI – June 16, 2013
Triplemanía XXII – August 17, 2014
Triplemanía XXIII – August 9, 2015
Triplemanía XXIV – August 28, 2016
Triplemanía XXV – August 26, 2017
Triplemanía XXVI – August 25, 2018
Triplemanía XXVII – August 3, 2019
Triplemanía XXVIII – December 12, 2020 (This was the first Triplemania without an audience due to the COVID-19 pandemic.)
Triplemanía XXIX – August 14, 2021

The largest attended event this far was the boxing match between Juan Manuel Márquez and Sergey Fedchenko of the World Boxing Organization light welterweight championship on April 14, 2012.
Mexican Superstar & Monterrey native, Gloria Trevi, is the only female entertainer to sell out the Arena on 10 different occasions.

Gallery

See also

References

External links

Official site

Capitanes de Ciudad de México
Indoor arenas in Mexico
Music venues completed in 2012
Sports venues completed in 2012
NBA G League venues
Sports venues in Mexico City
Volleyball venues in Mexico
Basketball venues in Mexico